Civitas Schinesghe is the first recorded name related to Poland as a political entity first attested in 991/2. The original deed is missing, but is mentioned in an 11th-century papal regesta called Dagome iudex. It states that the Piast duke Mieszko I's wife, Oda von Haldensleben, had given the guidance of unam civitatem in integro, que vocatur Schinesghe ("a whole state, which is called Schinesghe") over to the Holy See.

Though a state of Poland is not explicitly mentioned, the name Schinesghe most likely refers to Gniezno, one of the main settlements of the West Slavic Polans. In the year 1000, at the Congress of Gniezno, the first Polish archdiocese was established, and Mieszko's son Duke Bolesław I Chrobry was acknowledged as frater et cooperator of the Holy Roman Empire by Emperor Otto III.

Borders under Mieszko I 

Analysis of the document can help reconstruct the borders of the Polish realm:
sicuti incipit a primo latere longum mare, "as it starts from the first side of a long sea" (presumably the Pomeranian coast – on the Baltic Sea)
fine Bruzze 'end Bruzze' – "along the Prussian borders" (settlement area of the Old Prussians)
usque in locum, qui dicitur Russe – "up to a place called Rus' (east of Masovia)
et fines Russe extendente usque in Craccoa – "Russia ends and extending into Cracow"
et ab ipsa Craccoa usque ad flumen Odde recte – "and from there right along the Oder river"
in locum, qui dicitur Alemure, "in a place called The Alemure" (sometimes identified as Olomouc in Moravia though Olomouc is upriver on the Oder, not down)
et ab ipsa Alemura usque in terram Milze recte intra Oddere – "to the Milceni lands" (part of the Imperial Margraviate of Meissen)
et exinde ducente iuxta flumen Oddera usque in predictam civitate Schinesghe. – "and from its borders along the Oder to aforementioned Schinesghe."

The last statement suggests that Schinesghe is by the Oder and on the Baltic coast. This could mean that Schinesghe has a double meaning in the document - it is first used as the name of the entire state and then as the name of a border town - most probably Szczecin.

Notes

References

10th century in Poland